The following events occurred in October 1937:

October 1, 1937 (Friday)
U.S. Supreme Court Justice Hugo Black gave a radio address admitting that he had once been a member of the Ku Klux Klan, but had resigned and never rejoined. Black repudiated the Klan and pointed out that his voting record in the Senate demonstrated that he was "of that group of liberal senators who have consistently fought for the civil, economic and religious rights of all Americans, without regard to race or creed."

October 2, 1937 (Saturday)
The Parsley Massacre began in Hispaniola when Dominican President Rafael Trujillo made an inflammatory speech against Haitians.
The Nationalists captured Covadonga.
Ronald Reagan made his screen debut with the release of the film Love Is on the Air, also starring June Travis.
Samuel R. Caldwell became the first man arrested for selling Cannabis, October 2, 1937.
Born: 
Johnnie Cochran, lawyer, in Shreveport, Louisiana (d. 2005)
Roberto Herlitzka , Italian actor, in Turin.

October 3, 1937 (Sunday)
Thousands of members of the British Union of Fascists marched through the London district of Bermondsey to mark the fifth anniversary of the organization's founding. Anti-fascists jeered and threw eggs, bricks and other objects as 3,000 police fought to maintain order. Over 100 arrests were made.
Died: Richard Hertwig, 87, German zoologist; E. J. Rapson, 76, British numismatist, philologist and professor of Sanskrit

October 4, 1937 (Monday)
A submarine of unknown nationality fired a torpedo at the British destroyer  as it patrolled the Mediterranean, the first such attack since the Nyon agreement went into effect. The torpedo missed its target and the Basilisk countered by dropping depth charges, to unknown effect.
Born: Jackie Collins, novelist, in Hampstead, London, England (d. 2015); Franz Vranitzky, Chancellor of Austria, in Vienna

October 5, 1937 (Tuesday)
In Chicago, U.S. President Franklin D. Roosevelt made the Quarantine Speech, describing war as a "contagion" and calling for an international "quarantine" of aggressor nations.
The Ben-Gurion letter was written by David Ben-Gurion, then head of the Jewish Agency for Israel, providing insight into his reaction to the Peel Commission.
Born: Barry Switzer, American football player and coach, in Crossett, Arkansas

October 6, 1937 (Wednesday)
A general election was held in the Canadian province of Ontario. The Liberal Party led by Mitchell Hepburn was re-elected for a second term.
Italy sent three new squadrons of Savoia-Marchetti SM.79 bombers to assist the Nationalists in Spain.
Born: Emilio Isgrò, Italian artist, in Barcellona Pozzo di Gotto; Renato Capecchi, Italian-American genetist, Nobel Prize 2007, in Verona (d. 1998).
Died: Angelo Musco, 65, Italian actor.

October 7, 1937 (Thursday)
A Nationalist court-martial declared death for the captured mercenary American pilot Harold Edward Dahl, but the sentence was immediately annulled by a reprieve.
The American magazine Woman's Day was first published.
Born: Chet Powers, singer-songwriter, in Danbury, Connecticut (d. 1994) 
Died: Renate Müller, 31, German singer and actress (fall from a window, possibly suicide)

October 8, 1937 (Friday)
The Japanese reported the capture of Chengtingfu along the Beiping-Hankou Railway in Hebei Province.
Died: Theodor Alt, 91, German painter

October 9, 1937 (Saturday)
Benito Mussolini turned down an invitation from Britain and France to attend a conference on the question of foreign volunteers in Spain.
Italy sent a note of support to Japan for exercising "the right of self defense".
Died: Ernest Louis, Grand Duke of Hesse, 68; Percy Stout, 61, English rugby union player

October 10, 1937 (Sunday)
Sir Oswald Mosley was knocked unconscious by a stone that struck him in the head when he stood on a truck to address a Fascist rally in Liverpool.
The New York Yankees won the World Series for the second straight year, four games to one, with a 4–2 defeat of the New York Giants.
The Labor Party (Stronnictwo Pracy) was founded in Poland.
Born: George W. Strawbridge, Jr., educator, historian, investor and philanthropist, in Philadelphia, Pennsylvania; Peter Underwood, jurist and Governor of Tasmania, in the United Kingdom (d. 2014)

October 11, 1937 (Monday)
Duke and Duchess of Windsor's 1937 tour of Germany: The Duke of Windsor and his wife began a visit to Nazi Germany, arriving at Berlin Friedrichstraße station by train from Paris. The duke was taken on a tour of a factory by German Labour Front leader Robert Ley. 
Charles Lindbergh and wife Anne began their second visit to Nazi Germany. Over the next two weeks Colonel Lindbergh would be shown the Focke-Wulf, Henschel and Daimler-Benz factories and permitted to examine the Dornier Do 17 bomber and Messerschmitt Bf 109 fighter.
The U.S. Supreme Court decided Ex parte Levitt.
Franklin D. Roosvelt received at the White House Vittorio Mussolini. The Duce’s son, a well-known cinephile, was coming back from a visit to Hollywood studios.
Born: Bobby Charlton, footballer, in Ashington, England; Ron Leibman, American actor, in Manhattan, (d. 2019).

October 12, 1937 (Tuesday)
France and Yugoslavia extended their mutual assistance pact of 1927 for an additional five years.
U.S. President Franklin D. Roosevelt gave a fireside chat on the topic of legislation to be recommended to Congress.
Died: 
Al Brady, 26, American criminal (killed by FBI agents)
Alceo Dossena, 59, Italian sculptor and presumed forger.

October 13, 1937 (Wednesday)
Germany sent a note to Belgium guaranteeing that Belgian neutrality would be respected as long as it refrained from military action against Germany.
In Rome, the Special Tribunal for the Defense of the State sentenced the antifascist members of the Internal Socialist Center. Rodolfo Morandi, Aligi Sassu and four other defendants were condemned to ten years of prison.

October 14, 1937 (Thursday)
A total of seven people were killed on a day of violence in Palestine. Three were killed when a mine blew up a train northeast of the Palestinian city of Jaffa. A policeman shot two Arabs who refused to halt near the scene of the explosion. Elsewhere, two attacks on buses killed two Arabs and wounded three Jews.

October 15, 1937 (Friday)
The Montreux Convention Regarding the Abolition of the Capitulations in Egypt went into effect.
The Japanese puppet state known as the North Shanxi Autonomous Government was installed in Datong.
The Ernest Hemingway novel To Have and Have Not was published.
The musical drama film Heidi starring Shirley Temple and Jean Hersholt was released.
Born: 
Linda Lavin, singer and actress, in Portland, Maine
Giovanni Rana, Italian pasta maker, in Cologna Veneta
Dead: Renato Paresce, 51, Italian painter and journalist.

October 16, 1937 (Saturday)
Several fascist organizations united to form the Hungarian National Socialist Party.
Grand Mufti of Jerusalem Haj Amin al-Husseini escaped to Syria before the British could include him among the more than 100 Arab leaders in Palestine they arrested.
Died: Jean de Brunhoff, 37, French writer, illustrator and creator of Babar the Elephant (tuberculosis)

October 17, 1937 (Sunday)
Japanese forces occupied Baotou.
A United Air Lines Douglas DC-3 crashed at Haydens Peak, Wyoming in adverse weather, killing all 19 aboard.
Rioting broke out in Teplice, Czechoslovakia between members of the Sudeten German Party and police.
Born: Paxton Whitehead, actor, in East Malling, Kent, England
Died: J. Bruce Ismay, 74, English businessman

October 18, 1937 (Monday)
Recession of 1937–38: The New York Stock Exchange crashed to 125.73 points, its lowest level in two years.
The historic Reims Cathedral, heavily damaged in the World War, was re-consecrated.

October 19, 1937 (Tuesday)
Italy raised taxes significantly in an effort to meet the cost of increased arms production and maintaining its colonies.
Died: Ernest Rutherford, 66, New-Zealand born British physicist

October 20, 1937 (Wednesday)
The Japanese Tenth Army was formed.
Born: Juan Marichal, baseball player, in Monte Cristi, Dominican Republic; Giuseppe Pericu, Genoa's mayor (1997 - 2007), in Genoa.

October 21, 1937 (Thursday)
The Asturias Offensive and the War in the North ended in Nationalist victory with the capture of Gijón.
Generalissimo Francisco Franco increased his powers with a decree concentrating all the authority into a new National Council, whose members Franco could appoint and dismiss as he wished. Franco assumed the right to name his own successor as well.
62 were executed in Stalin's latest purge.
The Catholic Centre Party in the Free City of Danzig was ordered to dissolve, leaving the Nazi Party as the only party allowed to exist in Danzig.
The screwball comedy film The Awful Truth starring Irene Dunne and Cary Grant was released.
In Linate (Milan), the Enrico Forlanini airport was inaugurated. 
Born: Thengai Srinivasan, actor and comedian, in Tamil Nadu, British India (d. 1988)

October 22, 1937 (Friday)
The Duke of Windsor and his wife met Adolf Hitler at the Berghof. As they departed Hitler made the Nazi salute, which the Duke returned.
Riots broke out in Khemisset, French Morocco when nationalists demanding political reforms clashed with police.
The historical film Conquest starring Greta Garbo and Charles Boyer was released.
Born: Luigi Viviani, Italian politician and trade unionist, Senator of the Italian Republic, in Verona, Italy

October 23, 1937 (Saturday)
Federal elections were held in Australia. The Australian Labor Party picked up 11 seats in the House of Representatives and 13 in the Senate, but the incumbent United Australia Party led by Prime Minister Joseph Lyons continued to stay in power with the help of its coalition partner the Country Party.
Born: Carlos Lamarca, communist guerrilla fighter, in Rio de Janeiro (d. 1971)

October 24, 1937 (Sunday)
Jean Batten set a new record for flying from Australia to England when she landed at Croydon Airport 5 days, 18 hours and 15 minutes after leaving Port Darwin.
The French freighter Oued Mellah was bombed and sunk by a plane of unknown nationality east of Barcelona.
The radio opera I've Got the Tune was first broadcast on CBS Radio.
Ferencvárosi TC won the 1937 Mitropa Cup, beating in Rome SS Lazio 5-4 (the Hungarian team had already won 4-2 the forward match in Budapest). Sixteen teams from nine nations (Romany first time included) had participated to the tournament.  
Born: Rosaria Piomelli, architect, in Naples, Italy

October 25, 1937 (Monday)
Celâl Bayar became Prime Minister of Turkey. 
Kansas City City Hall was dedicated.
Died: Serge Wolkonsky, 77, Russian theatrical worker

October 26, 1937 (Tuesday)
The Defense of Sihang Warehouse began in Shanghai.
George VI opened the first Parliament of his reign.
The first edition of Treccani encyclopedia was accomplished, after eight years of work. The 35th and last volume was presented to Mussolini by the publisher Giovanni Treccani and by the Minister of Education Giovanni Gentile.
Died: Józef Dowbor-Muśnicki, 70, Polish general
Birth: Raymond John DHU, York, Western Australia

October 27, 1937 (Wednesday)
The Japanese announced the capture of Pingding in Shanxi Province after a three-day battle.
Japan rejected a proposed conference in Brussels to settle the war in China.
This is the cover date of an issue of the weekly magazine Night and Day that included a notorious review by its editor Graham Greene of the movie Wee Willie Winkie. Greene wrote of nine-year old Shirley Temple's "dubious coquetry" and "well-shaped and desirable little body". 20th Century Fox launched a lawsuit on Temple's behalf and would win £3,500.
The Opera Nazionale Balilla and all the various fascist youth organizations were reunited in the Gioventù Italiana del Littorio. The new organization, headed by the PNF secretary Achille Starace, accentuated the indoctrination and the militarization of the Italian children and boys.  
On Italy, the historical colossal Scipione l'africano (Scipio Africanus), by Carmine Gallone, was released. The movie, realized with wide means and strongly supported by the fascist regime, did not get the hoped public success.

October 28, 1937 (Thursday)
The Spanish government relocated again from Valencia to Barcelona.
The 15th anniversary of the March on Rome was celebrated in Italy. High-ranking Nazis including Rudolf Hess and Viktor Lutze attended the ceremonies to demonstrate Germany's new friendship with Italy.
Tony Lazzeri signed as a free agent with the Chicago Cubs.
Born: Lenny Wilkens, basketball player and coach, in Brooklyn, New York

October 29, 1937 (Friday)
Henry Armstrong knocked out Petey Sarron in the sixth round at Madison Square Garden to win the World Featherweight Championship of boxing.
George Eyston set a new land speed record of 309 mph at the Great Salt Lake.
The Federated Autonomous Government of Mongolia (a precursor to Mengjiang) was formed with Hohhot as its capital.
Mussolini inaugurated Aprilia, the fourth city founded in the improved lands of the Pontine Marshes. The 31, he inaugurated the fifth one, Guidonia, seat of an airport.

October 30, 1937 (Saturday)
Mussolini recalled the Italian Ambassador to France due to strained relations between the two countries over Italy's participation in the Spanish Civil War.
Hitler bestowed the Order of the German Eagle on Yasuhito, Prince Chichibu as a gesture of friendship between Germany and Japan.
The British cargo ship Jean Weems was bombed and sunk by warplanes off the coast of Catalonia. A Daily Herald correspondent identified one of the pilots who sank the ship as Benito Mussolini's son Bruno.
The adventure film West of Shanghai starring Boris Karloff was released.
Born: Tony Cucchiara, Italian singer-songwriter, in Agrigento (dead 2018)

October 31, 1937 (Sunday)
Chinese forces abandoned the Defense of Sihang Warehouse. The top floors of the warehouse burst into flames from Japanese shelling as the Chinese withdrew. 
In Rome, the governor Piero Colonna officially inaugurated the obelisk of Auxum. The monument, prey of the Ethiopian war, was laid in front of the Ministry of Colonies (now seat of the FAO) and was restituted to the African country only in 2005.
Born: Tom Paxton, folk singer-songwriter, in Chicago
Died: Charlotte Johnson Baker, 82, American physician; Ralph Connor, 77, Canadian novelist

References

1937
1937-10
1937-10